Jane is an upcoming live-action animated educational adventure television series. It is due to premiere on Apple TV+ on April 14, 2023.

Premise
A young environmentalist who idolizes Jane Goodall goes on an adventure with her best friend and a chimpanzee in order to protect the wild animals of the world.

Cast
 Ava Louise Murchison as Jane Garcia
 Mason Blomberg as David
 Tamara Almeida
 Dan Abramovici
 Jazz Allen
 Sam Marra

Production
The series was ordered by Apple TV+ in February 2021, with it being a live action-animation hybrid series. It will be produced alongside the Jane Goodall Institute. The cast for the series was revealed in January 2023, with Ava Louise Murchison starring in the titular role.

Release
The series is set to premiere on April 14, 2023.

References

2020s American children's comedy television series
2023 American television series debuts
American children's education television series
American television series with live action and animation
Apple TV+ children's programming
Apple TV+ original programming
English-language television shows
Jane Goodall
Television series about children
Upcoming television series